Morshi Assembly constituency is one of the 288 Vidhan Sabha (legislative assembly) constituencies in Maharashtra state in western India. This constituency is one of the eight constituencies located in the Amravati district.

Morshi is part of the Wardha Lok Sabha constituency along with five other Vidhan Sabha segments, namely Wardha, Arvi, Deoli and Hinganghat in the Wardha district and Dhamangaon Railway in the Amravati district.

As per orders of Delimitation of Parliamentary and Assembly constituencies Order, 2008, No. 43 Morshi Assembly constituency is composed of the following: 
1. Warud Tehsil, 2. Morshi Tehsil (Part), Revenue Circle-Ambada, Hiwarkhed, Rithpur, Morshi and Morshi (MC) of the district.

Members of Legislative Assembly

See also
 Morshi
 List of constituencies of Maharashtra Vidhan Sabha

References

Assembly constituencies of Maharashtra
Amravati district